The girls' individual normal hill/4 km Nordic combined competition at the 2020 Winter Youth  Olympics was held on 18 January at the Les Tuffes Nordic Centre, France.

Results

Ski jumping
The ski jumping part was held at 10:00.

Cross-country
The cross-country part was held at 14:00.

References

Girls' individual normal hill/4 km